Elizabeth Olten was a 9-year-old who was murdered by her neighbor Alyssa Bustamante, who was 15 at the time, in St. Martins, Missouri, on October 21, 2009.

Bustamante lured Olten into the woods and strangled and stabbed her to death. Bustamante murdered Olten simply due to homicidal ideation and to see what it was like to kill someone. She was later indicted and pleaded guilty to second-degree murder and armed criminal action and was sentenced to life in prison with the possibility of conditional release in 2024 for second-degree murder. However, due to her additional conviction of armed criminal action, even if she is granted conditional release in 2024, she will have a consecutive sentence of 30 years in prison. This makes her earliest probable release in 2054, when she will be 60 years old.

History 
Elizabeth Olten, aged nine, lived four houses down from Bustamante. On October 21, 2009, Bustamante convinced her younger sister to bring Olten to the forest by their homes to hang out. Upon Olten's arrival, Bustamante strangled Olten, slit her throat and stabbed her eight times in the chest. Bustamante then buried Olten's body in a grave that she had dug five days before in the woods behind her house and covered the grave with leaves.

Perpetrator 

Alyssa Dailene Bustamante's grandparents, Gary and Karen Brooke, took legal custody of her and her three younger siblings in 2002, since her mother Michelle had addiction issues and her father Caesar was serving time in prison. Friends started noticing changes in Alyssa around 2007 when she was hospitalized after a suicide attempt. On her YouTube profile, she listed "cutting" under her hobbies. She had also posted a photograph of herself on social media where she held two fingers to her head, pretending to shoot herself.

After the murder, Bustamante wrote in her journal (though later attempted to scribble it out):

She then attended a church dance (Bustamante was actively involved in her local Church of Jesus Christ of Latter-Day Saints) while police searched for Olten.

Trial, conviction, and appeal 
Bustamante first appeared in court on November 17, 2009, where she pled not guilty and was indicted on first-degree murder and armed criminal action (due to using a knife in the murder). In January 2012, she took a plea deal to the lesser charges of second-degree murder and armed criminal action. A few weeks later, she was sentenced to life imprisonment with the possibility of conditional release, and a consecutive sentence of 30 years.

Her appeal against the sentence was denied in March 2014.

The victim's mother, Patricia Preiss, agreed to settle the lawsuit she filed against Bustamante. The terms of the agreement require Bustamante to disclose any compensation from case coverage to Preiss.

Alyssa was seen by several mental health professionals, who all testified that she has major depressive disorder and borderline personality disorder.

In popular culture
Alyssa's case was profiled in Deadly Women. On October 19, 2012, a thriller film loosely based on the case called My Name Is 'A' by Anonymous was released. The murder was the topic of an episode of Kids Who Kill (season 1, episode 5).

References 

2009 in Missouri
2009 murders in the United States
Deaths by stabbing in Missouri
Murder in Missouri
October 2009 crimes in the United States
October 2009 events in the United States
Female murder victims
Female murderers
Murder committed by minors
Incidents of violence against girls